"Muñeca de trapo" (Rag Doll) is the first single from the fourth studio album of La Oreja de Van Gogh, Guapa. The song is known for its heavy sound, strong beat, and surging guitars. Its lyrics, in comparison to other songs by the band, deal with a more serious theme, in which a disregarded woman compares herself to a rag doll when she cannot express her feelings for her loved one, even though she loves him deeply, claiming "eres todo lo que mas quiero, pero te pierdo en mis silencios" (You're the one I most love, but I lose you in my silence).

Charts

External links
 Lyrics with English translation

References

2006 songs
Number-one singles in Spain
La Oreja de Van Gogh songs